Frank Wesley Wainright (October 10, 1967 – April 5, 2016) was a professional American football tight end in the National Football League for ten seasons for the New Orleans Saints, Philadelphia Eagles, Miami Dolphins, and Baltimore Ravens.  He played high school his freshman through junior year at Peoria Heights High School. He played college football at the University of Northern Colorado and was drafted in the eighth round of the 1991 NFL Draft.

References

1967 births
2016 deaths
Sportspeople from Peoria, Illinois
Players of American football from Illinois
American football tight ends
New Orleans Saints players
Philadelphia Eagles players
Miami Dolphins players
Baltimore Ravens players
Northern Colorado Bears football players